Southern California coastal subregion (HUC 1807) is one of 10 hydrologic subregions within the California water resource region and is one of 222 water resource subregions in the United States hydrologic unit system.

The Southern California coastal subregion, sometimes called the South Coast Hydrologic Subregion, is a second-level subdivision. The tiers of the classification system, in order from largest to smallest, are regions, subregions, basins (formerly accounting units), subbasins (formerly cataloging units), watersheds, and subwatersheds. These geographic areas contain either the drainage area of a major river, or the combined drainage areas of a group of rivers. 

The South Coast Hydrologic Subregion is composed of three third-level hydrological units called water resource basins (formerly accounting units), each with its own 6-digit hydrologic unit code.

List of Southern California coastal subregion basins

See also
 Groundwater recharge
 Water in California
 Principal aquifers of California

References

 Resource
Water resource subregions
Geography of California
United States hydrologic unit system
Southern California